This article shows all participating team squads at the 2014 FIVB Volleyball Men's Club World Championship, held from 5 to 10 May 2014 in Belo Horizonte, Brazil.

Pool A

Sada Cruzeiro

Head Coach:  Marcelo Méndez

Belogorie Belgorod

Head Coach:  Gennadiy Shipulin

Matin Varamin

Head Coach:  Daniele Bagnoli

Mets de Guaynabo
Head Coach:  Javier Gaspar

Pool B

Trentino Diatec

Head Coach:  Roberto Serniotti

UPCN San Juan

Head Coach:  Fabián Armoa

Al-Rayyan

Head Coach:  Igor Arbutina

Espérance de Tunis

Head Coach:  Foued Kamoun

References

External links
Official website

C
2014 in volleyball